Dmitri Vladimirovich Nikitinsky (born 9 February 1992) is a Russian football player who plays for FC Balashikha.

Career
Nikitinsky made his professional debut for Saturn on 15 July 2009 in the Russian Cup game against FC Luch-Energiya Vladivostok.

He made his Russian Premier League debut for FC Tom Tomsk on 27 May 2011 in a game against FC Rubin Kazan.

References

External links
 
  Statistics at RFU DPF site
 

1992 births
People from Volokolamsky District
Sportspeople from Moscow Oblast
Living people
Russian footballers
Russia youth international footballers
Russia under-21 international footballers
Association football defenders
Association football midfielders
FC Saturn Ramenskoye players
FC Tom Tomsk players
FC Shinnik Yaroslavl players
FC Arsenal Tula players
FC Tambov players
FC Zenit-Izhevsk players
Russian Premier League players
Russian First League players
Russian Second League players